MIPR may refer to:

 Military Interdepartmental Purchase Request, a logistics process of the United States military
 Masters in Intellectual Property Rights, a post-graduate degree programme of National Law University, Jodhpur
 Ministry of Industry and Primary Resources, a department of the Government of Brunei
 IEEE International Workshop on Multimedia Information Processing and Retrieval (IEEE-MIPR),  an annual conference run by the Institute of Electrical and Electronics Engineers
 Manhattan Institute for Policy Research